"Strawberry" is a song co-written, produced and performed by Nicole Renée, issued as the lead single from her eponymous debut album. The song contains a sample of "Paradise" by Grover Washington Jr., and it was Renée's only song to chart on the Billboard Hot 100, peaking at #83 in 1998.

Chart positions

References

1998 debut singles
Nicole Renée songs
Atlantic Records singles
Song recordings produced by Nicole Renée
Songs written by John Blake Jr.
Songs written by Nicole Renée
1998 songs
Strawberries